Jonathon Edington (born October 29, 1976) is a Fairfield, Connecticut, United States, patent lawyer who achieved national notoriety when, on August 28, 2006, he murdered his neighbor, Barry James, after being told that James had molested Edington's two-year-old daughter. There has been no evidence found that Barry James molested Edington's daughter or anyone else. On August 30 Edington was released on $1 million bond. It was widely expected that Edington would attempt to mount a psychiatric defense at his murder trial, however Edington instead pleaded guilty to the crime and was sentenced to 12 years in prison on August 31, 2007.

The story had generated a large amount of press coverage in the United States and overseas.

Background
Edington studied engineering at Syracuse University, and received his J.D. from Fordham Law School in New York City in 2004. He practiced patent law at a small firm in Fairfield.

Criminal case
Court documents released on September 12, 2006 state that a 2-year-old girl had complained to her mother, Christina Edington, that her neighbor, Barry James, had repeatedly molested her.  Christina Edington was in Rhode Island with her daughter visiting relatives when the murder took place.  The girl had just told Mrs. Edington when she immediately called to inform her husband, Jonathon Edington.  According to the affidavit, within minutes Edington went next door to 101 Colony Street in Fairfield, where he found Barry James, 59, and stabbed him thirteen times in the heart, chest and hand. James died about an hour later at Bridgeport Hospital.

James' estate hired attorney Peter Ambrose, who issued a statement on behalf of the James family that disputed the allegations:  "The family of Barry James stand together in defending the unfounded allegations of molestation.  They are vicious and hurtful, and the family only wishes that their son and brother had the opportunity to defend himself. When all of the facts are made known, we are confident that Barry will be cleared of these allegations."

On October 10, 2006, Edington pleaded "not guilty" to all charges. On October 19, 2006, the Fairfield police concluded that James did not molest Edington's daughter. Further, after investigating the molestation allegation and saying they found no evidence to back it up, they also revealed that Edington's wife, Christina, refused to cooperate with the investigation into the slaying, and prosecutor Jonathan Benedict has said a defense psychiatrist determined Edington's wife suffered from postpartum depression.

In June 2007, Edington pleaded guilty to a reduced charge of first degree manslaughter. He was sentenced Friday, August 31, 2007, to 12 years in prison for first-degree manslaughter. Prosecutor Jonathon Benedict had recommended that Edington serve 20 years in prison. The judge suspended eight years of that, leaving 12 years to serve, plus five years probation.

Civil case
The estate of Barry James filed an order in the Bridgeport Superior Court for a $5 million lien against Edington's property.   The lien would be used to secure any verdict reached against Edington.  James' 87-year-old mother lived with him and would be a beneficiary of the estate.  She is legally blind and discovered the body. After she showed police the body, they found Edington at home in his kitchen with blood on his hands and forearms, authorities said. An attorney for the Jameses served Christina Edington with a wrongful death lawsuit, accusing her of triggering the stabbing and making up the abuse claim. A similar lawsuit is pending against Edington.

References

Living people
1976 births
Fordham University School of Law alumni
American prisoners and detainees
Prisoners and detainees of Connecticut
Lawyers from Fairfield, Connecticut
Syracuse University alumni
American people convicted of manslaughter